John Andrew Snively (1889 – January 22, 1958) was a pioneering citrus grower in Florida and Georgia, USA.  At his height, his companies were responsible for one-third of the Florida citrus crop.

Snively was born in Schellsburg, Pennsylvania, the son of Frank B. Snively  and Laura Irvin Snively. In 1910, at age 21, he moved to Winter Haven, Florida and began working as a fertilizer salesman.  A few years later, just before the Florida land boom of the 1920s, Snively bought his first grove.  It was a 10-acre site near Lake Eloise in Winter Haven.  Through hard work and thrift, he managed to expand his grove operations.  In 1934, he established the Polk Packing Company, which later became Snively Groves Inc.  His company was the largest fruit packing and canning company in the United States in the 1930s, which employed over 1,500 people, and was the largest business in Winter Haven at the time.

With the out break of World War II, the citrus industry boomed.  The demand for canned and packaged citrus fruit from the United States and other Allied Nations greatly exceeded growers ability to supply the fruit.  The Allies were willing to purchase all of the canned fruit that could be produced of any quality and at any price.  Citrus prices skyrocketed, and Snively Groves Inc experienced massive growth.

During the 1940s, Snively built Magnolia Mansion, a stately New Orleans style home on the shores of Lake Eloise, on Winter Haven's famous Chain of Lakes.  Magnolia Mansion was purchased by Cypress Gardens theme park in the 1970s.

After World War II, with the wartime market gone, the citrus industry began to experience wild fluctuations in market prices.  At times, the price of citrus fruit fell below the cost of production.  Snively recognized that citrus growers had to organize to survive.  Organization was needed to stabilize market prices and to create quality control standards.  His leadership and organizational skills were instrumental in creating the Florida Citrus Mutual, the most influential citrus industry organization of its time.  He later served as President of the Florida Citrus Exchange.  He remained an active and influential figure in the citrus industry up until his death in 1958.

Snively was also involved in other business activities.  He served on the board of the Tavares & Gulf Railroad and the Winter Haven Exchange National Bank.  Later in life, he built several housing sub-divisions on some of his grove land, including Inwood and Eloise Woods in Winter Haven.  He was also elected to the political position of City Commissioner in Winter Haven for three years.

Snively was known to be outspoken and gruff in his business dealings, but was also known as a humanitarian.  He was actively involved in several charities benefiting youth welfare.

Snively was a member of the First Presbyterian Church of Winter Haven.  He was married to Dorothy DeHaven Snively, and had a son and two daughters.  He died of a heart attack at age 68.

He was an original inductee into the Florida Citrus Hall of Fame.

John A. Snively Elementary School, on Snively Avenue, in Winter Haven, Florida is named after him.  The school has approximately 500 students.  He was also the maternal grandfather of musician Gram Parsons.

References

American chief executives
Businesspeople from Pennsylvania
Citrus farmers from Florida
Winter Haven, Florida
History of Polk County, Florida
Businesspeople from Florida
People from Winter Haven, Florida
1889 births
1958 deaths
20th-century American businesspeople